Sichuan food can refer to:

 Sichuan Food (restaurant) - Michelin starred restaurant in The Netherlands
 Sichuan (Szechuan) cuisine - cooking style originating in the Chinese province Sichuan